Craniophora melanisans is a moth of the family Noctuidae. It is endemic to the oases of Saudi Arabia, Oman and Israel.

Adult specimens have been recorded in August in Israel, in May in Saudi Arabia and in October in Oman. There are probably multiple generations per year.

External links
The Acronictinae, Bryophilinae, Hypenodinae and Hypeninae of Israel

Acronictinae
Moths of the Middle East
Moths described in 1980